On 10 April 2006, a Kenya Air Force Harbin Y-12 crashed in Marsabit County in Kenya as it approached the Marsabit air strip. The crash killed 14 passengers, including a number of politicians.

Background 
The flight to the region was to mediate a feud between rival communities at the Ethiopia–Kenya border.

Victims 

 Mirugi Kariuki MP, assistant minister of internal security
 Titus Ngoyoni MP, assistant minister of regional development
 Bonaya Godana MP, deputy leader of the official opposition
 Abdi Sasura MP
 Guracha Galgallo MP
 Abdullahi Adan, member of the East African parliament
 Peter King'ola, Moyale district commissioner

Investigation 
The plane crashed due to poor weather over Marsabit Hill. Heavy fog caused the plane to crash as it approached the runway.

References 

Aviation accidents and incidents in Kenya
Aviation accidents and incidents in 2006
2006 in Kenya
2006 disasters in Kenya
April 2006 events in Africa